Phaleria macrocarpa is a species of flowering plant in the family Thymelaeaceae. It is commonly called buah mahkota dewa, God's crown, pau and is a dense evergreen tree, indigenous to Indonesia.

Botany
It has green, tapered leaves. The flowers are made up to two to four petals, and range from green to maroon in color. The flowers make a compound of two to four, with color from green to maroon. They are red when ripe. Each fruit has one to two brown, ovoid, and anatropous seeds per fruit. The extract of the plant has been evaluated for potential pharmacological uses.

Images

References

External links

macrocarpa
Taxa named by Jacob Gijsbert Boerlage
Taxa named by Rudolph Scheffer